Molen is an unincorporated community in Emery County, Utah, United States.

Description

It was settled as an outgrowth of Ferron beginning about 1878 after Michael Molen brought his cattle and horses into Castle Valley and settled by Ferron Creek. Molen was previously named Lower Ferron.

See also

References

External links

Unincorporated communities in Emery County, Utah
Unincorporated communities in Utah